Yanzhuang is a town in  Ju County in southern Shandong province, China, located  due north of the county seat. , it has 49 villages under its administration.

See also 
 List of township-level divisions of Shandong

References 

Township-level divisions of Shandong